The 2000 Minnesota Twins was the last Twins team in a consecutive string record of eight losing seasons.  The team finished with a 69–93 record, with weak hitting but slightly better pitching.  One would not have suspected that this team, led by Manager Tom Kelly, would contain the nucleus of Ron Gardenhire's team that will reach the postseason only two years later.

Offseason
 December 13, 1999: Under the Rule 5 draft, the Twins send minor leaguer Jared Camp and cash to the Florida Marlins in exchange for future Cy Young Award winner Johan Santana.
January 4: Signed catcher Marcus Jensen as a free agent.  Jensen was granted free agency on October 2.
January 27: Signed Butch Huskey as a free agent.  On July 15, the team traded Huskey to the Colorado Rockies for Todd Sears and cash.

Regular season
Tampa Bay's Gerald Williams homered on the first pitch thrown in the Metrodome this year.  Minnesota's Matt Lawton homered on the Dome's final pitch this year.
On April 9, a major league first occurred, when both teams posted innings with back-to-back-to-back home runs.  In the sixth, Twins Ron Coomer, Jacque Jones and Matthew LeCroy belted consecutive homers.  In the Kansas City Royals' eighth, Carlos Beltrán, Jermaine Dye and Mike Sweeney homered off Twins pitchers Eddie Guardado and Héctor Carrasco.
On April 15, Héctor Carrasco gave up Cal Ripken's 3,000th hit, in the Dome.  Of the 24 players who have reached that plateau, now three have collected the benchmark hit off Twins' pitching: in 1995, Mike Trombley gave up Eddie Murray's 3,000th hit, also in the Dome.  In 1985, Frank Viola watched Rod Carew stroke his 3,000th hit in Anaheim Stadium.
On May 10, the club overcame their largest deficit to win.  Down 8–1 in the seventh, the Twins finished the nine-inning game with a 10–9 win.  Eddie Guardado threw thirteen pitches and collected the win over the Cleveland Indians.
The lone representative of the Twins in the All-Star Game was outfielder Matt Lawton.
The highest paid Twin in 2000 was Brad Radke at $3,500,000; followed by Matt Lawton at $2,000,000.
Harmon Killebrew, Rod Carew, Tony Oliva, Kent Hrbek, Kirby Puckett, and Calvin Griffith were the inaugural inductees in the Twins Hall of Fame.

Offense
The most solid offensive year came from the team's lone all-star representative, right fielder Matt Lawton.  Lawton hit .305 with 13 home runs, 88 RBI, and 23 stolen bases.  Also notable this year were shortstop Cristian Guzmán's major league leading 20 triples (a Twins record).  Like most of his career with the Twins, David Ortiz spent much of the 2000 season rehabbing injuries.  He did, however, play in 88 games as the team's designated hitter.  The Twins also experimented with Butch Huskey in the DH spot.  Not surprisingly, this was not a successful experiment, with Huskey playing in only 39 games at the position.

Pitching
The starting rotation showed flashes of brilliance with Brad Radke, Eric Milton, Mark Redman, and Joe Mays in for most of the year.  Radke, Milton, and Redman all had ERAs of under 5.  The fifth starter was uncertain, with Sean Bergman making 14 starts, and J. C. Romero making 11.  Romero's ERA of 7.02 did not suggest the dominant reliever he would subsequently become.

Despite uncertainty as to the identity of the closer, the bullpen was stellar.  LaTroy Hawkins, Bob Wells, Eddie Guardado, Travis Miller, and Héctor Carrasco all had strong years out of the bullpen.  Hawkins led the club with 14 saves.

One notable presence among the pitching staff was rookie Johan Santana, acquired from the Houston Astros via the Florida Marlins in the Rule 5 draft.  In order for the Twins to keep Santana under Rule 5, Santana was required to stay on the major league roster for the entire season.  He did, and his numbers did nothing to suggest he would one day win a Cy Young Award.  His ERA was 6.49 and he struck out 64 batters in 86 innings.  He was used almost exclusively in mop-up roles, although he did start five games.  He spent most of the 2001 season in the minor leagues.  The Twins' foresight in keeping him on the roster during the 2000 season must be regarded as one of the greatest uses ever of the Rule 5 draft.

Defense
The infield was mostly steady with Ron Coomer at first, Jay Canizaro at second, Guzman at short, Corey Koskie at third, and Denny Hocking backing them all up.  The 2000 season saw the inception of the "Soul Patrol" outfield of Jacque Jones, Torii Hunter, and Lawton.  Nobody was able to establish himself as the everyday catcher, with Matt LeCroy playing in 48 games at the position, Chad Moeller in 40, Marcus Jensen in 37, A. J. Pierzynski in 27, and Danny Ardoin in 10.

Season standings

Record vs. opponents

Notable transactions
April 1: Signed outfielder Dustan Mohr as a free agent.
April 4: Signed infielder Jay Canizaro as a free agent.
May 23: Selected Casey Blake off waivers from the Toronto Blue Jays.
June 5: In the amateur draft, the Twins drafted future major leaguers such as pitcher Adam Johnson (1st round, second pick) and outfielder Jason Kubel (12th round).
June 22: Released pitcher Sean Bergman.
August 31, 2000: Midre Cummings was traded by the Minnesota Twins to the Boston Red Sox for Hector De Los Santos (minors).
September 9: Traded pitcher Héctor Carrasco to the Boston Red Sox for outfielder Lew Ford.
December 11: Brandon Knight was drafted by the Twins from the New York Yankees in the 2000 rule 5 draft.
December 19: Signed catcher Tom Prince as a free agent.
December 20: Ron Coomer granted free agency; pitcher Mike Lincoln released.

Roster

Player stats

Batting

Starters by position
Note: Pos = Position; G = Games played; AB = At bats; H = Hits; Avg. = Batting average; HR = Home runs; RBI = Runs batted in

Other batters
Note: G = Games played; AB = At bats; H = Hits; Avg. = Batting average; HR = Home runs; RBI = Runs batted in

Pitching

Starting pitchers
Note: G = Games pitched; IP = Innings pitched; W = Wins; L = Losses; ERA = Earned run average; SO = Strikeouts

Other pitchers
Note: G = Games pitched; IP = Innings pitched; W = Wins; L = Losses; ERA = Earned run average; SO = Strikeouts

Relief pitchers
Note: G = Games pitched; W = Wins; L = Losses; SV = Saves; ERA = Earned run average; SO = Strikeouts

Other post-season awards
Calvin R. Griffith Award (Most Valuable Twin) – Matt Lawton
Joseph W. Haynes Award (Twins Pitcher of the Year) – Eric Milton
Bill Boni Award (Twins Outstanding Rookie) – Mark Redman
Charles O. Johnson Award (Most Improved Twin) – Cristian Guzmán
Dick Siebert Award (Upper Midwest Player of the Year) – Darin Erstad
The above awards are voted on by the Twin Cities chapter of the BBWAA
Carl R. Pohlad Award (Outstanding Community Service) – Denny Hocking
Sherry Robertson Award (Twins Outstanding Farm System Player) – John Barnes

Farm system 

LEAGUE CHAMPIONS: Elizabethton

References

External links
Diamond Mind's Analysis of the Twins' 2000 season
Player stats from www.baseball-reference.com
Team info from www.baseball-almanac.com
Twins history since 2000, from www.mlb.com 
2000 Standings

Minnesota Twins seasons
Minnesota Twins season
Minnesota Twins